Żołynia  is a village in Łańcut County, Subcarpathian Voivodeship, in south-eastern Poland. It is the seat of the gmina (administrative district) called Gmina Żołynia.

The village has a population of 5,106.

References

Villages in Łańcut County
Kingdom of Galicia and Lodomeria
Lwów Voivodeship